Butt of Lewis Lighthouse, designed by David Stevenson, was built at Butt of Lewis to aid shipping in the 1860s. Unusual for a lighthouse in Scotland, it is constructed of red brick, and is unpainted. The station was automated in 1998, one of the last to be converted. A modern differential GPS base station has now been sited on a nearby hill to further aid navigation. This hill was also the site for a Lloyd's Signal Station from the 1890s.

The road to the lighthouse passes a sheltered cove called Port Stoth. Agricultural lazy beds are also visible along the coast. The Butt of Lewis features some of the oldest rocks in Europe, having been formed in the Precambrian period up to 3000 million years ago. Following the coast southwest from the lighthouse there is a natural arch called the "Eye of the Butt". It can be best viewed from the Habost machair.

See also

 List of lighthouses in Scotland
 List of Northern Lighthouse Board lighthouses
 List of Category A listed buildings in the Western Isles

References

External links

 Butt of Lewis history by the Northern Lighthouse Board
 Panoramas of the Butt of Lewis Lighthouse 
 Northern Lighthouse Board

Lighthouses completed in 1862
Lighthouses in Outer Hebrides
Category A listed lighthouses
Isle of Lewis
1862 establishments in Scotland